Kannapuram railway station is situated in Kannapuram village of the Kannur district.

Line and location 
It is well connected to Kannur, Pazhayangadi, Madakkara, Pappinisseri, Payyannur and Taliparamba by road.

Notable places nearby 
 Parassini Muthappan Temple
 Vismaya Amusement Park
 Annapurneshwari Temple, Cherukunnu
 Government College of Engineering, Kannur
 National Institute of Fashion Technology, Kannur
 Vellikeel Eco Park
 Kannur University-Mangattuparamba Campus
 Parassinikkadavu Snake Park
 Kerala Armed Police IV Battalion 
 Indian Coast Guard Academy

References 

Railway stations in Kannur district
Palakkad railway division